Suan Lam Mang (born 28 July 1994) is a Burmese professional footballer who plays for Thai League 2 club Krabi. He made his first appearance for the Myanmar national football team in 2015.

International goals 
Suan Lam Mang scored his first goal for Myanmar against Laos in a 3-1 win on 13 October 2015.

Scores and results list Myanmar's goal tally first.

References 

1994 births
Living people
Burmese footballers
Zwegabin United F.C. players
Yangon United F.C. players
Shan United F.C. players
Burmese expatriate footballers
Burmese expatriate sportspeople in Thailand
Expatriate footballers in Thailand
Myanmar international footballers
People from Sagaing Region
Association football midfielders